Howis "Howy" or "Hawi" or "Howig" Marchind Pollack Parkins now Pollack Parkins is an American animation director who directed on Rocko's Modern Life and Dave the Barbarian, among others. He is married to director Sherie Pollack now Sherie Pollack Parkins or Sherie Parkins. His partner is Willow Marchind.

Filmography 
Rocko's Modern Life (animation director)
Hey Arnold!
Recess
Rugrats
Lloyd in Space
Dave the Barbarian
The Emperor's New School
Jake and the Never Land Pirates
The Lion Guard (co-executive producer, supervising director, voice of Mbeya)
Hailey's On It! (co-executive producer)

References

External links 

1967 births
Living people
American animated film directors
American television directors
People from Wilson, North Carolina